Just Zoot is the debut and only studio album by Australian rock/pop band Zoot. The album was released in July 1970 and peaked at number 12 on the Kent Music Report.

The title is a correction to the reference of people often calling the band "The Zoot".

Track listing
LP/Cassette

Personnel
Zoot
Darryl Cotton - vocals
Rick Springfield - guitar
Beeb Birtles - bass
Rick Brewer - drums

Charts

Release history

References

Columbia Records albums
1970 debut albums